Arminsyah (3 May 1960 – 4 April 2020) was an Indonesian prosecutor. He was Vice Attorney General of Indonesia from 15 November 2017 to his death on 4 April 2020. He died because of traffic collision at Jagorawi Toll Road while driving a Nissan GT-R.

References 

1960 births
2020 deaths
Attorneys General of Indonesia
Road incident deaths in Indonesia
People from Padang